Toni Küchler (born 20 February 1960) is a Swiss sports shooter. He competed at the 1988 Summer Olympics and the 1992 Summer Olympics.

References

1960 births
Living people
Swiss male sport shooters
Olympic shooters of Switzerland
Shooters at the 1988 Summer Olympics
Shooters at the 1992 Summer Olympics
People from Obwalden